Archaeospheniscus wimani is an extinct species of penguin. It is also the oldest known species of its genus, as its remains were found in Middle or Late Eocene strata (34-50 MYA) of the La Meseta Formation on Seymour Island, Antarctica. It is known from a fair number of bones.

The species' binomen honors Carl Wiman, an early 20th-century researcher who laid the groundwork for the classification of the prehistoric penguins.

References

Further reading 
 
 Marples, Brian J. (1953): Fossil penguins from the mid-Tertiary of Seymour Island. Falkland Islands Dependencies Survey Scientific Reports 5: 1–15.
 Myrcha, Andrzej; Jadwiszczak, Piotr; Tambussi, Claudia P.; Noriega, Jorge I.; Gaździcki, Andrzej; Tatur, Andrzej & Del Valle, Rodolfo A. (2002): Taxonomic revision of Eocene Antarctic penguins based on tarsometatarsal morphology. Polish Polar Research 23(1): 5–46. PDf fulltext

wimani
Extinct penguins
Eocene birds
Paleogene animals of Antarctica
Fossils of Antarctica
Fossil taxa described in 1953
Taxa named by Brian John Marples